JSSL Singapore (or Junior Soccer School and League Singapore) is a privately owned youth soccer academy based in Singapore which runs regular league tournaments and provides professional coaching for competitive pathway development. As of 2018, JSSL Singapore managed 12 youth leagues with 36 divisions, 350 teams, and over 3,000 youth players.

The academy was started in 2002 and is currently based at "The Arena" in Woodleigh Park, Singapore, after being forced to relocate from the Home United Youth Football Academy grounds by the Singapore Land Authority following noise pollution complaints.

Management 
JSSL Singapore is led by owner and managing director Harvey Davis, alongside general manager Gavin Lee and executive director Paul Parker, a former England and Manchester United defender. In addition, the academy contracts over 20 coaches across the various age divisions.

Partnerships with other clubs

Fulham FC 
In 2016, the media reported that JSSL Singapore and Fulham FC had started a partnership at the end of 2015 in which outstanding youth players in Singapore would be provided with the opportunity to train at the Fulham FC Academy for two weeks.

In 2017, JSSL Singapore invited Fulham FC's Under-15 team to participate in the JSSL Professional Academies Singapore International 7s, and fully funded their trip to Singapore to participate in the tournament. Later that year, it was announced that Benjamin James Davis, a young Thai footballer holding Singaporean citizenship and the son of JSSL's director, had signed a two-year scholarship at Fulham's academy after rising through the ranks at JSSL Singapore and the Football Association of Singapore's Junior Centre of Excellence.

Manchester City 
In 2017, Felix Goddard, a German-born British youth who joined JSSL in 2013 at the age of 9, earned a spot at the Manchester City Academy.

Tampines Rovers FC 
In March 2018, JSSL Singapore and local Singapore Premier League (previously known as S-League) side Tampines Rovers FC officially announced a partnership to create pathways for talented youth players for professional development. The agreement, initially set to last for three years until 2021, saw JSSL Singapore coordinate youth development programmes for Tampines Rovers and feed promising talents into the professional side's youth setup. In addition, JSSL Singapore also provided full scholarships to 60 local youth players between 6 and 14 years old to cover the costs of participation at the academy's programme for a year.

References 

Youth football in Singapore